Two ships were named Empire Oil:

, a  tanker built 1940 by Blythwood Shipbuilding
, a  tanker built 1941 by Furness Shipbuilding

Empire ships
Ship names